Willet is an English-language given name and surname. Notable people with the surname include:

Given name
Willet Babcock cabinetmaker, alderman, fireman, and opera house proprietor in Paris, Texas, United States
Willet Ball (1873 – 1 June 1962) was a British journalist and political activist
 Willet Casey (1762–1848), farmer and political figure in Upper Canada
Willet Green Miller (1867–1925), American geologist, the namesake of the Willet G. Miller Medal
 Willet M. Hays (1859–1927), American plant breeder and U.S. Assistant Secretary of Agriculture

Surname
Abraham Willet (1825–1888), Dutch art collector and amateur painter.
Andrew Willet (1562 – 4 December 1621) was an English clergyman and controversialist
Deb Willet (1650–1678), maid of  Samuel Pepys, famous for her diary which chronicled her liaison with Pepys
 Gerald Willet (1934–2017), American businessman and politician
 Jennifer Willet (born 1975), Canadian artist, researcher and curator
 John Willet (1815–1889), Scottish engineer
Samuel Walter Willet Pickup (March 1, 1859 – November 15, 1935) was a Canadian farmer, merchant, shipbuilder, shipowner, and politician
 Slim Willet (1919–1966), American disc jockey, musician, and songwriter
William Willet (1869–1921), American portrait painter, muralist, stained glass designer, studio owner and writer
 Willet brothers of Willet (band), American Christian rock band

See also

Willett (name)
Willetts